The Hinds County School District is a public school district based in Raymond, Mississippi (US).

In addition to Raymond, the district serves the communities of Bolton, Byram, Edwards, Learned, Terry, and Utica, as well as sections of Jackson.

Schools
 High schools (Grades 9-12)
Raymond High School
Terry High School
 K-8 schools
Bolton-Edwards Elementary/Middle School
Utica Elementary/Middle School
Middle schools (grades 6-8)
Byram Middle School
Carver Middle School

Elementary schools
Raymond Elementary School (Grades K-5)
Gary Road Intermediate School (Grades 3-5)
Gary Road Elementary School (Grades K-2)

School Feeder Patterns
Bolton-Edwards Attendance Zone
Bolton-Edwards Elementary/Middle (K-8); Raymond High (9-12)
Byram-Terry Attendance Zone
Gary Road Elementary School (K-2); Gary Road Intermediate (3-5); Byram Middle (6-8); Terry High (9-12)
Raymond Attendance Zone
Raymond Elementary (K-5); Carver Middle (6-8); Raymond High (9-12)
Utica Attendance Zone (includes Learned)
Utica Elementary/Middle (K-8); Raymond High (9-12)

Demographics

2006-07 school year
There were a total of 6,417 students enrolled in the Hinds County School District during the 2006–2007 school year. The gender makeup of the district was 49% female and 51% male. The racial makeup of the district was 61.31% African American, 37.54% White, 0.53% Hispanic, and 0.62% Asian. 43.1% of the district's students were eligible to receive free lunch.

Previous school years

Accountability statistics

See also

List of school districts in Mississippi

References

External links

Education in Hinds County, Mississippi
School districts in Mississippi
School districts in the Jackson metropolitan area, Mississippi